Dancer Bus is an electric bus designed and produced by Vėjo Projektai UAB in Klaipėda, Lithuania. The electric bus is manufactured of composite materials, including recycled PET bottles. In-wheel traction motors are currently in development. Fully charged bus can ride a distance of up to  source. The lithium-titanate battery fully charges in less than 10 minutes. The capacity is 93 passengers with 32 seats and one space for a wheelchair. The bus is certified in the European Union. In April 2020, two buses were purchased by the Klaipėda City Municipality to be used for public transportation.

References

Sources
 Dancer Bus specifications

External links
 Official website
 Official manufacturer website

Vehicles introduced in 2019
Battery electric buses
Low-floor buses
Single-deck buses
Electric buses
Vehicles of Lithuania